Jack Walton may refer to:

Jack C. Walton (1881–1949), American politician
Jack Walton (basketball) (1926–1952), American basketball player
Jack Walton (footballer) (born 1998), English footballer
Jack Walton (rugby league) (fl. 1902–1913)
Jack Walton (singer) (born 1996), English participant on The X Factor

See also
John Walton (disambiguation)